Stuart Nathaniel Lake (September 23, 1889 in Rome, New York – January 27, 1964 in San Diego, California) was an American writer, professional wrestling promoter, and press aide who focused on the American Old West.

Professional career 

Lake was a professional wrestling promoter and a press aide to Theodore Roosevelt during the Bull Moose presidential campaign in 1912. During World War I, he was run over by a truck.

Works about Wyatt Earp 

His 1931 biography of Wyatt Earp, Wyatt Earp: Frontier Marshal, was a best seller and was adapted for several films, including Frontier Marshal, a 1939 production starring Randolph Scott, and John Ford's My Darling Clementine.  His work also inspired the 1955-1961 ABC television series, The Life and Legend of Wyatt Earp, starring Hugh O'Brian in the title role. The biography was later found to be highly fictional. Lake was the first writer to describe Earp's use of the Colt Buntline. Later researchers have been unable to establish that Earp ever owned such a weapon.

Other films 

Lake also wrote for other motion pictures, including The Westerner, starring Gary Cooper and Walter Brennan; Powder River with Rory Calhoun; and Winchester '73 starring James Stewart.

Accuses politician of bribery

Bibliography

Wyatt Earp: Frontier Marshal (fictionalized biography)
The O.K. Corral Inquest (Introduction)
In the Path of the Padres (Non-fiction)
Tales of the Kansas cow towns (Magazine article, The Saturday Evening Post)

Filmography 

Lake wrote scripts for the following shows.

 Winchester '73 (TV Movie) (story-uncredited) 1967
 Powder River (based on a book by Lake)   1953 
 Winchester '73 (story)   1950 
 My Darling Clementine (based on the book by Lake)   1946 
 Wells Fargo Days (Short) (dialogue/story)   1944 
 The Westerner (film) (from the story by Lake)  1940 
 Frontier Marshal (1939 film) (based on a book by Lake)   1939 
 Wells Fargo (film) (based on a story by Lake)   1937 
 Frontier Marshal (1939 film) (based on the novel Wyatt Earp: Frontier Marshal)   1934 
 Buck Privates (story)  1928

References

External links
 
 Wyatt Earp and the "Buntline Special" Myth

1889 births
1964 deaths
20th-century American biographers
People from Rome, New York
American military personnel of World War I
People from Los Angeles
American male non-fiction writers
Historians from New York (state)
Cornell University alumni
20th-century American male writers